The Odisha State Cooperative Milk Producers Federation also known as OMFED is a state government cooperative under the ownership of Ministry of Cooperation, Government of Odisha. It is situated at Bhubaneswar, the state capital of Odisha.
It is an apex level Milk Producers' Federation in Orissa registered under Cooperative Society Act – 1962.  Omfed was established based on AMUL pattern under operation flood-II of National Dairy Development Board (NDDB), for promoting, production, procurement, processing and marketing of milk & milk products initially in undivided districts of Puri, Cuttack, Dhenkanal, Keonjhar.

Management
The Orissa state Cooperative Milk Producers' Federation Ltd. is controlled by a Board Of Directors which consists of Chairman of all affiliated Dist. Cooperative Milk Producers' Unions, three nominees of Government of Orissa, a nominee from the National Dairy Development Board and Managing Director of the Omfed (Who is the ex officio member).  The Chairman of the BOD is elected amongst the members of the Board.  The post of Chairman of the Federation is honorary. Shri Pradeep Kumar Jena, IAS is the administrator of and Shri Ashish Chandra Sinha, Managing Director of OMFED.

See also
Bihar State Milk Co-operative Federation
Karnataka Milk Federation
Kerala Co-operative Milk Marketing Federation

References

External links 

State agencies of Odisha
Dairy products companies of India
Companies based in Bhubaneswar
Cooperatives in India
Dairy cooperatives in India
1985 establishments in Orissa
Indian companies established in 1985